Khard Mard-e Rezai (also Romanized as Khard Mard-e Reẕā’ī and Kherad Mard-e Reẕā’ī; also known as Khard Mard) is a village in Pazevar Rural District, Rudbast District, Babolsar County, Mazandaran Province, Iran. At the 2006 census, its population was 360, in 99 families.

References 

Populated places in Babolsar County